Stance is an American sock, underwear and T-Shirt brand founded in December 2009. Stance is headquartered in San Clemente, California. As of March 2015, the company had sold over 36 million pairs of socks and raised over $115 million from investors.

In early January 2015, Stance began raising $50 million to fund their expansion into the underwear market. In April 2016, Stance raised an additional $30 million in a funding round that valued Stance at $400 million and was led by Mercato Partners and included August Capital, Kleiner Perkins Caufield & Byers, Menlo Ventures, Shasta Ventures, and Sherpa Capital as returning investors.

Stance was named the official sock of the NBA and MLB in April 2015 and May 2016, respectively.

The company has 18 US retail stores in Irvine, Las Vegas, Cabazon, Livermore, Los Angeles, Miami, New York City, Orlando, Portland, Salt Lake City, San Clemente, San Diego, Tulalip, New Jersey, Chicago, and Minnesota. In October 2018, Stance opened their first International store in Covent Garden, London, England.

History
Stance was founded in 2009 by Jeff Kearl, John Wilson, Aaron Hennings, Ryan Kingman and Taylor Shupe. The original founders saw an opportunity to address a category of fashion they felt had been overlooked by many brands and the majority of the industry.

The company first began shipping product in August 2010, and now ships over 15 million pairs of socks each year. Stance has raised a significant amount of venture capital and is sold in over 40 countries worldwide.

In March 2015, the Wall Street Journal reported the company had raised $50 million from Silicon Valley venture capital firms and that the brand would be expanding into men’s underwear. In April 2015, the NBA announced that Stance had been named the official on-court sock of the NBA starting in the 2015-2016 season. As part of the deal, Stance would be allowed to display its logo on all socks worn on-court by players, a first in NBA history for apparel companies. Stance opened its first store in the SoHo neighborhood of New York City in November 2015.

In 2015, Stance posted a 356% employee increase from the previous year, reaching 114 employees, at its San Clemente headquarters. Stance was listed No. 24 on the Orange County Business Journal’s list of the 51 Biggest Based in Orange County Apparel Businesses.

Between 2017 and 2020, the company has undergone several rounds of layoffs.

The brand won Best Socks of the Year in 2017 with their tribute to rapper, Gucci Mane. Unfortunately early in the same year, the company experienced the first of many layoffs due to external disruptions and mismanagement of funds.

Sponsorship
Stance’s brand ambassadors are called "Punks and Poets". They include musicians, athletes, designers, artists, stylists, writers and photographers.

 Athletes
 Andre Drummond
 Allen Iverson
 Chandler Parsons
Donovan Mitchell
 Dwyane Wade
 Klay Thompson
 Lauren Fleshman
 Todd Richards
 Bryan Gonnella 
Kassia Meador
 John John Florence
 Silje Norendal
 Nyjah Huston
 Chris Cole
 Theotis Beasley
 Jamie Thomas
 Andrew Reynolds
 Kenny Roczen
 Chad Reed
 Troy Lee
 Bubba Watson
 Mikey Wright
 Neen Williams
 Daniel Ricciardo

 Musicians/Bands
 Billie Eilish
 Soko
 Haim
 Nikki Lane
 Lil Uzi Vert
 Kid Cudi
 Thurzday
 Santigold
 Rihanna
 Big Sean
 Willow Smith
 A$AP Ferg
 Models
 Bambi Northwood-Blyth
 Hanne Gaby Odiele
 Designers and Stylists
 Imogene Barron
 Ronnie Fieg
 Alexandra Spencer/4th & Bleeker
 Artists/Illustrators/Photographers
 Brooke Reidt
 Josie Ramondetta
 Langley Fox Hemmingway
 Mark Oblow
 Russ Pope
 Kid Creature
 Todd Francis
 Bijou Karman

See also

List of sock manufacturers

References

External links

2009 establishments in California
Clothing brands of the United States
Companies based in San Clemente, California
Clothing companies established in 2009
Underwear brands
Hosiery brands
Socks